Puessans is a commune in the Doubs department in the Bourgogne-Franche-Comté region in eastern France.

Geography
It nestles at the foot of a hill in the Val-Mont-Martin.

Population

Economy

Puessans has remained primarily agricultural.

See also
 Communes of the Doubs department

References

External links

 Puessans on the intercommunal Web site of the department 

Communes of Doubs